Lennoxville is an arrondissement, or borough, of the city of Sherbrooke, Quebec, Canada. Lennoxville is located at the confluence of the St. Francis and Massawippi Rivers approximately five kilometres south of downtown Sherbrooke.

Lennoxville had previously existed as an independent city until January 1, 2002, when the city of Lennoxville, along with several other formerly independent towns and cities in the region, were merged with the city of Sherbrooke. A demerger referendum held on June 20, 2004 failed to attract the required majority of votes to reestablish Lennoxville as an independent city.

History

Lennoxville was first settled in 1819, although the Mallory family began farming at the edge of the eventual town limits in 1804. Its name was taken from Charles Lennox, 4th Duke of Richmond, who was then Governor General of Canada.

Jefferson Davis, President of the Confederate States of America during the American Civil War, lived in Lennoxville from 1867 to 1868 after being released on bail. He had spent two years imprisoned in Virginia awaiting his treason trial. Two of his sons went to Bishop's College School.

The city's war memorial is located at 150 Queen Street.  Of note is a brass plaque naming Daniel Bolduc a Canadian citizen who was killed in Vietnam while serving in the US Army in 1969.  Additionally, the community was so moved by the military service of its past and current residents that a plaque honouring Afghanistan was unveiled in 2018.  No one with Lennoxville ties died in the conflict.

Government

The borough is represented by one councillor on Sherbrooke City Council, and two councillors who serve on the local borough council but not on the full city council.

Linguistic profile

Historically, as with most of the Eastern Townships, Lennoxville originated as a predominantly anglophone community with an initially small francophone population. Today the population is almost evenly split between anglophones and francophones with francophones making up a plurality among native speakers (35.3%) whereas English is the language most spoken at home. Of the various districts in Sherbrooke (which itself began as an anglophone community but has since transformed into a city where French is the dominant language), Lennoxville has the largest proportion of English speakers remaining.  Lennoxville is designated as a bilingual borough and municipal services are provided in both English and French.

Education

Several educational institutions are located in Lennoxville, including Bishop's University, Champlain Regional College, Bishop's College School and Alexander Galt Regional High School. During the school year, the population of Lennoxville increases significantly as students from elsewhere in Canada and around the world move to Lennoxville to attend school. Bishop's College School is home to Canada's oldest indoor ice hockey rink.

At Bishop's University, frosh week (orientation week) is held in the first week of the fall semester, which generally falls around the first week of September. In 2005 Bishop's University received an award for running one of the most successful orientation weeks in the country .  Homecoming weekend is typically celebrated the last weekend of September, with a football game, gatherings of designated graduating classes, and various social functions.

Transportation
Quebec Routes 143 and 108 provide access to Lennoxville from surrounding communities and nearby Autoroute 10 and Autoroute 55 provide easy access to Montreal, Quebec City, and the United States. Autoroute 410 is currently being extended from its current terminus on 108 to further east, bypassing Lennoxville, with a bridge built over the Massawippi river and culminating at R-108 near Glenday Road, Alexander Galt Regional High School and the Dairy and Swine Research and Development Centre.  Bishop's University. The extension of Autoroute 410 will redirect heavy truck traffic from downtown Lennoxville's often congested single intersection.

References

External links

Borough of Lennoxville

Populated places established in 1871
Populated places disestablished in 2002
Boroughs of Sherbrooke
Former cities in Quebec
Former municipalities in Quebec
Academic enclaves
1871 establishments in Canada